Gillock Glacier is a glacier 5 nautical miles (9 km) long, flowing north from Mount Walnum to the west of Smalegga Ridge, in the Sor Rondane Mountains.

Mapped by Norwegian cartographers in 1957 from air photos taken by U.S. Navy Operation Highjump, 1946–47, and named for Lieutenant Robert A. Gillock, U.S. Navy, navigator on Operation Highjump photographic flights in this area and other coastal areas between 14° and 164° East.

See also
 List of glaciers in the Antarctic
 Glaciology

References

Glaciers of Queen Maud Land
Princess Ragnhild Coast